Ferro molybdenum is an important iron-molybdenum metal alloy, with a molybdenum content of 60-75% It is the main source for molybdenum alloying of HSLA steel.

Production
The alloy is produced by heating a mixture of molybdenum(VI) oxide MoO3, aluminium, and iron.  The oxide and the aluminium combine via an aluminothermic reaction to give molybdenum in situ. The ferromolybdenum  can be purified by electron beam melting or used as it is. For alloying with steel the ferromolybdenum  is added to molten steel before casting. Among the biggest suppliers of ferromolybdenum in Europe are the English trading house Derek Raphael and Co Ltd and the English Trading House MTALX LTD in London. A large ferromolybdenum producer in the US is Langeloth Metallurgical Company in Langeloth, Pennsylvania.

References

External links

Ferroalloys
Molybdenum